Events from the year 1308 in the Kingdom of Scotland.

Incumbents
Monarch – Robert I

Events
 23 May – Battle of Inverurie
 after 23 May – Harrying of Buchan
 29 June – Battle of the River Dee
 June–August – siege, capture and destruction of Aberdeen Castle by Scottish forces
 August – King Robert defeats McDougall of Lorne at The Battle of the Pass of Brander
 25 December – Forfar Castle recaptured by Scottish forces
unknown date
 Last meeting of the Scottish Parliament to be held in Gaelic takes place at Taynuilt

Deaths
 10 October – Patrick IV, Earl of March (born 1242)
 8 November – Duns Scotus, one of the most important philosopher-theologians of the High Middle Ages (born )
date unknown
 Gilbert de Umfraville, Earl of Angus

See also

 Timeline of Scottish history

References

 
Years of the 14th century in Scotland
Wars of Scottish Independence